The loure is a French Baroque dance. Loure may also refer to:

Loure (bagpipe), a type of bagpipe native to Normandy, popular in the 17th and 18th centuries
Louré (violin), a violin technique important among nineteenth-century virtuosi
Edward Loure (fl. 2010s), Tanzanian tribal activist

See also
Lore (disambiguation)
Lour., taxonomic author abbreviation of João de Loureiro (1717–1791), Portuguese Jesuit missionary and botanist
Loures, city and a municipality in Portugal